Culyer is a surname. Notable people with the surname include:

Anthony J. Culyer (born 1942), British economist
John Y. Culyer (1839–1924), American civil engineer, landscape architect, and architect

See also
 Culver (surname)
 Cuyler